Bridge of Dragons (stylized as A Bridge of Dragons) is a 1999 American romantic action film directed by Isaac Florentine, and starring Dolph Lundgren, Cary-Hiroyuki Tagawa, Valerie Chow, and Gary Hudson. Lundgren and Tagawa had previously starred together in the 1991 film Showdown in Little Tokyo. It was the first film by Nu Image to be shot in Bulgaria.

Plot
The tough and cold mercenary Warchild, is working for the man who took care of his war training and upbringing, the greedy General Ruechang. Ruechang is planning to take over the country by marrying Princess Halo. But Halo discovers that Ruechang killed her father to gain more power than he had working for the King, so she decides to run away. Warchild is the one who has to bring her back to Ruechang, but the one thing no one counted on happens: Warchild and Halo fall in love, and together they take on the forces of Ruechang. So his tyranny can be brought down and set the people free.

Cast

Dolph Lundgren as Warchild
Cary-Hiroyuki Tagawa as General Ruechang
Valerie Chow as Princess Halo (credited as Rachel Shane)
Gary Hudson as Emmerich
John Bennett as The Registrar
Scott L. Schwartz as Belmont
Jo Kendall as Lily
Dave Nichols as York
Bashar Rahal as Robert
Velizar Binev as The Tailor
Ivan Istatkov as Arena Ring Master
Nikolay Binev as The Doctor
Boyan Milushev as Jake
Sevdelin Ivanov as Scott
Brian Fitkin as Renegade Leader

References

External links
 
 

1999 films
1999 action films
American romantic action films
Films directed by Isaac Florentine
Films shot in Bulgaria
1990s English-language films
Films produced by Boaz Davidson
Films about mercenaries
1990s American films